TMBC can refer to:
 Tameside Metropolitan Borough Council, in Greater Manchester, United Kingdom
 Tonbridge and Malling Borough Council, in Kent, United Kingdom